GN Software is a Japanese video game developer and publisher of consumer console games, mainly for the PlayStation 2. GN Software is under the parent company Good Navigate, which is also what GN stands for. From 2010 in advance, all their ports are released under the brand "Piacci".

Games produced

As GN Software 
2003
Ren'ai CHU! Happy Perfect

2004
Komorebi no Namikimichi: Utsurikawaru Kisetsu no Naka da
Apocripha/0

2005
Izumo Complete
Angel's Feather -Kuro no Zanei-
Like Life an hour

2006
I/O
Izumo 2: Mōki Tsurugi no Hirameki
_Summer##

2007
Majokko a la Mode II
Castle Fantasia

2008
Izumo 2
Akaneiro ni Somaru Saka Parallel
Suigetsu

2009
Pia Carrot he Youkoso!! G.P -Gakuen Princess-
Akaneiro ni Somaru Saka Portable
MagusTale Eternity

As Piacci 
2008
Pia Carrot e Youkoso!! G.O. ~Summer Fair~ 
Hoshiful ~Hoshi no Furu Machi~

2009
Canvas 3 ~Hakugin no Portrait~
Like Life Every Hour

2010
Sakura Sakura -Haru Urara-
Fairly Life Miracle Days
White Breath Perfect Edition
77 (Sevens) ~beyond the Milky way~

2011
Pia Carrot e Youkoso!! 4 ~Natsu no Koitatsu~
Kuon no Kizuna Sairinshou -Portable-
Suzukaze no Melt -days in the sanctuary-
Suigetsu 2

2012
SuGirly Wish
Yaneura no Kanojo

External links
 

Amusement companies of Japan
Video game companies of Japan